Chun Jae-Woon  (born March 18, 1981) is a retired South Korean football player. He has previously played for Ulsan Hyundai, Suwon Samsung, Jeonbuk Hyundai and Jeju United.

References

External links 
 

Ulsan Hyundai FC players
Suwon Samsung Bluewings players
Jeonbuk Hyundai Motors players
Jeju United FC players
Home United FC players
Association football midfielders
K League 1 players
Singapore Premier League players
1981 births
Living people
South Korean footballers
South Korean expatriate footballers
Expatriate footballers in Singapore
South Korean expatriate sportspeople in Singapore
Footballers at the 2004 Summer Olympics
Olympic footballers of South Korea